The Upsala Golf International was a golf tournament on the Swedish Golf Tour 1991–1993 and featured on the Challenge Tour in 1991 and 1992. It was played in Uppsala, 60 km north of Stockholm, Sweden.

The 1993 edition doubled as the Swedish International Stroke Play Championship, which was held at Upsala GC also in 2003 and 2004. The club, founded in 1937, uses the archaic spelling of Uppsala, Upsala.

Winners

Notes

References

External links
Coverage on the Challenge Tour's official site

Former Challenge Tour events
Swedish Golf Tour events
Golf tournaments in Sweden